Lucien Jacob (3 July 1930 – 28 November 2019) was a French politician.

References

Deputies of the 8th National Assembly of the French Fifth Republic
1930 births
2019 deaths